The İstanbul-Çerkezköy Regional is a regional rail service between Sirkeci Terminal in İstanbul and Çerkezköy, a town in Thracian Turkey. Train #81602 operates between İstanbul and Çerkezköy and train #81601 operates between Çerkezköy and İstanbul daily.

Named passenger trains of Turkey
Rail transport in Istanbul
Tekirdağ Province